Devid Yurievich Naryzhnyy (born 11 October 1999) is a Russian competitive ice dancer. With his former skating partner, Elizaveta Shanaeva, he is the 2020 World Junior bronze medalist and the 2019–20 Junior Grand Prix Final bronze medalist. He has also won three medals on the ISU Junior Grand Prix series, including gold medals at 2019 France and 2019 Russia.

Personal life 
Devid Yurievich Naryzhnyy was born on 11 October 1999 in Kharkiv, Ukraine. His parents, Olena/Elena Pyatash and Andrei Penkin are also figure skaters.

Career

Early years 
Naryzhnyy began learning to skate when his parents were part of an ice show in England when he was three years old. As a young skater, he trained in Kharkiv, coached by Galina Churilova, and Saint Petersburg. He also trained in Sochi for about six months, where his father had been offered a job. After moving to Moscow, he was coached by Ekaterina Rubleva and then met his next coaches, Irina Zhuk and Alexander Svinin, when Rubleva began working with them.

Naryzhnyy trained with his first ice dancing partner for about a year and later skated with Varvara Chekmeneva. He teamed up with Elizaveta Shanaeva during the 2016–2017 season. They are coached by Irina Zhuk and Alexander Svinin.

Shanaeva/Naryzhnyy won the 2017 Moscow Championship.

2018–2019 season 
Shanaeva/Naryzhnyy received their first ISU Junior Grand Prix (JGP) assignments in the 2018–19 season. They won the silver medal at 2018 JGP Bratislava and placed 4th at 2018 JGP Yerevan.

In November 2018, they won the junior gold medal at the 2018 Grand Prix of Bratislava. They placed fourth at the 2019 Russian Junior Championships.

2019–2020 season 
Returning to the Junior Grand Prix, Shanaeva/Naryzhnyy won their first JGP gold medal in September at the 2019 JGP France in Courchevel. Three weeks later, they won a second gold medal at the 2019 JGP Russia in Chelyabinsk. With these results, they qualified for the 2019–20 ISU Junior Grand Prix Final in Torino.  Shanaeva/Naryzhnyy placed third in the rhythm dance there, with her describing them as "quite happy" with their performance.  They were also third in the free dance, despite Naryzhnyy missing a twizzle level, and won the bronze medal.

After winning the junior national title at the 2020 Russian Junior Championships, Shanaeva/Naryzhnyy were assigned to compete at the 2020 World Junior Championships in Tallinn, Estonia.  First in the free dance, they won a small gold medal for the segment, becoming the only team to score above 70 points in the junior rhythm dance that season.  Third in the free dance, they dropped to third place overall and won the bronze medal.  Shanaeva said, "we got a lot of energy to show our maximum next season and to be ready to beat everyone."

2020–2021 season 
After junior Russian test skates in August, both became ill with COVID-19, first Shanaeva and then Naryzhnyy. This caused them to miss the first half of the season, competing only in December, on the fifth stage of the domestic Cup of Russia series, but having to withdraw after the rhythm dance due to Naryzhnyy getting food poisoned.

At the beginning of February, they competed on the 2021 Russian Junior Championships in Krasnoyarsk, placing third in the rhythm dance, second in the free dance and second overall. They claimed to be happy with their performances after such a difficult period, defining their result as a "silver medal with a golden shine."

They were scheduled to participate in the Russian Cup Final in Moscow but withdrew due to medical reasons. On the 17 and 18 of April, they performed in Team Tutberidze's show Champions on Ice in Krasnodar and Sochi.

2021–2022 season 
Moving to the international senior level, Shanaeva/Naryzhnyy won the bronze medal at the Budapest Trophy. They went on to make their senior Grand Prix debut at the 2021 Skate Canada International, where they finished in ninth place.

In December, Shanaeva/Naryzhnyy competed on the 2022 Russian Championship in Saint Petersburg, placing eighth in the rhythm dance and fifth in the free dance and finishing fifth overall.

Programs 
(With Shanaeva)

Competitive highlights 
GP: Grand Prix; CS: Challenger Series; JGP: Junior Grand Prix

With Morozov

With Shanaeva

With Chekmeneva

Detailed results 
Small medals awarded only at ISU Championships. ISU personal bests highlighted in bold.

With Shanaeva

Senior results

Junior results

References

External links 
 

1999 births
Russian male ice dancers
Living people
Sportspeople from Kharkiv
World Junior Figure Skating Championships medalists
Ukrainian emigrants to Russia
Russian people of Ukrainian descent